The 947 Ride Joburg (formally known as the 94.7 cycle challenge) is the world's second-largest timed cycle race, after the Cape Argus Cycle Race. It is held annually on cycle challenge Sunday, the third Sunday of November in the South African city of Johannesburg. Between 20,000 and 30,000 participants complete the challenging  course every year. The event's main sponsors are 947 (radio station) and Telkom (In previous years, Momentum.)

The 94.7 Mountain Bike Challenge is held the weekend before the road race. It consists of two distances; a  race and a  race. In 2012 a  fun ride was introduced and took place the day before the 94.7 Mountain Bike Challenge.

Past winners

Men

Women

Winners' speeds (male and female)

See also
 947 (radio station)
 Cape Town Cycle Tour
 Cycle racing

References

External links

 Cycle Challenge homepage

Cycle races in South Africa
Sports competitions in Johannesburg
Recurring sporting events established in 1997
Road bicycle races
Mountain biking events
1997 establishments in South Africa
Mountain biking events in South Africa
Spring (season) events in South Africa